Prototype methods are machine learning methods that use data prototypes. A data prototype is a data value that reflects other values in its class, e.g., the centroid in a K-means clustering problem.

Methods 
The following are some prototype methods
 K-means clustering
 Learning vector quantization (LVQ)
 Gaussian mixtures

Related Methods 
While K-nearest neighbor's does not use prototypes, it is similar to prototype methods like K-means clustering.

References 

Machine learning algorithms